Geoethics is the branch of ethics which relates to the interaction of human activity with our physical world in general, and with the practice of the Earth sciences in particular. It may also have relevance to planetary sciences. It is described as an emerging scientific and philosophical discipline, consisted of research and reflection on the values that serve as the bases of behaviors and practices wherever human activities interact with the Earth system. Moreover, geoethics promotes the ethical and social roles of geoscientists in conducting scientific and technological research and practice.

For these reasons, geoethics pursues recognition of humankind's duties and responsibility towards the Earth system. A more specialized use emerged as the term came to deal with the ethical, social, and cultural implications of the behavior and professional activities of geologists. Some scholars also cited that it provides a point of intersection for geosciences, sociology, economics and philosophy.

There are two international geoethics organizations, the International Association for Promoting Geoethics and the International Association for Geoethics.

References

Environmental ethics